The 2019 UEFA Under-19 Futsal Championship (also known as UEFA Under-19 Futsal Euro 2019) was the first edition of the UEFA Under-19 Futsal Championship, the biennial international youth futsal championship organised by UEFA for the men's under-19 national teams of Europe. The tournament was held at the Arēna Rīga in Riga, Latvia between 8–14 September 2019.

A total of eight teams played in the final tournament, with players born on or after 1 January 2000 eligible to participate. Spain won the title to become the first UEFA Under-19 Futsal Euro champions.

Host selection
The bid requirements were made available on 13 April 2018. A total of seven countries declared interest in hosting the tournament:

Only Georgia and Latvia submitted the bid dossier by the deadline of 25 July. Latvia were appointed as hosts by the UEFA Executive Committee on 27 September 2018.

Qualification

A total of 35 UEFA nations entered the competition, and with the hosts Latvia qualifying automatically, the other 34 teams competed in the qualifying competition to determine the remaining seven spots in the final tournament. The qualifying competition consisted of two rounds:
Preliminary round: The eight lowest-ranked teams were drawn into two groups of four teams. Each group was played in single round-robin format at one of the pre-selected hosts. The two group winners advanced to the main round.
Main round: The 28 teams (26 highest-ranked teams and two preliminary round qualifiers) were drawn into seven groups of four teams. Each group was played in single round-robin format at one of the pre-selected hosts. The seven group winners qualified to the final tournament.

The qualifying draw was held on 1 November 2018. The preliminary round was held between 21 and 26 January 2019, and the main round was held between 26 and 31 March 2019.

Qualified teams
The following teams qualified for the final tournament.

Final draw
The final draw was held on 7 June 2019, 21:00 EEST (UTC+3), at the Daugava Stadium in Riga, Latvia. The eight teams were drawn into two groups of four teams. There was no seeding, except that the hosts Latvia were assigned to position A1 in the draw. Based on the decisions taken by the UEFA Emergency Panel, Russia and Ukraine would not be drawn into the same group.

Squads
Each national team have to submit a squad of 14 players, two of whom must be goalkeepers.

Group stage
The final tournament schedule was announced on 25 June 2019.

The group winners and runners-up advance to the semi-finals.

Tiebreakers
In the group stage, teams are ranked according to points (3 points for a win, 1 point for a draw, 0 points for a loss), and if tied on points, the following tiebreaking criteria are applied, in the order given, to determine the rankings (Regulations Articles 18.01 and 18.02):
Points in head-to-head matches among tied teams;
Goal difference in head-to-head matches among tied teams;
Goals scored in head-to-head matches among tied teams;
If more than two teams are tied, and after applying all head-to-head criteria above, a subset of teams are still tied, all head-to-head criteria above are reapplied exclusively to this subset of teams;
Goal difference in all group matches;
Goals scored in all group matches;
Penalty shoot-out if only two teams have the same number of points, and they met in the last round of the group and are tied after applying all criteria above (not used if more than two teams have the same number of points, or if their rankings are not relevant for qualification for the next stage);
Disciplinary points (red card = 3 points, yellow card = 1 point, expulsion for two yellow cards in one match = 3 points);
UEFA coefficient for the qualifying round draw;
Drawing of lots.

All times are local, EEST (UTC+3).

Group A

Group B

Knockout stage
In the knockout stage, extra time and penalty shoot-out are used to decide the winner if necessary.

Bracket

Semi-finals

Final

Goalscorers
5 goals

 Adrián Rodríguez
 Antonio Pérez

3 goals

 Božo Sučić
 Tomasz Palonek
 Pavel Karpov
 David Peña
 Ricardo Mayor
 Danylo Bielan

2 goals

 Fran Vukelić
 Jakov Hrstić
 Bartosz Borowik
 Célio Coque
 Hugo Neves
 Ricardo Lopes
 Sévio Marcelo
 Tomás Reis
 Danil Karpyuk
 Denis Titkov
 Bernat Povill
 Cristian Molina
 Jesús Gordillo
 Denys Blank
 Oleh Nehela

1 goal

 Filip Petrušić
 Jakov Mudronja
 Josip Jurlina
 Mateo Mužar
 Toni Rendić
 Edgars Tarakanovs
 Toms Grīslis
 Jakub Raszkowski
 Krzysztof Iwanek
 Piotr Matras
 Daniel Costa
 Nuno Chuva
 Rui Moreira
 Tomás Paçó
 Kamil Gereykhanov
 Nito Valle
 Eduard Nahornyi
 Marian Masevych

1 own goal

 Andrejs Iļjins (playing against Portugal)
 Eduard Volkov (playing against Spain)

Team of the tournament
The UEFA technical observers selected the following 14 players for the team of the tournament:

 Krzysztof Iwanek (goalkeeper)
 Antonio Navarro (goalkeeper)
 Ricardo Mayor
 Tomás Paçó
 Alejandro Cerón
 Josip Jurlina
 Antonio Pérez
 Cristian Molina
 Bernat Povill
 Fran Vukelić
 David Peña
 Jesús Gordillo
 Adrián Rodríguez
 Hugo Neves

Broadcasting

Television 
All 15 matches will be live streamed in selected countries (including all unsold markets) and highlights are available for all territories around the world on UEFA.tv.

Participating nations

Non-participating European nations

Outside Europe

Radio

Participating nations

Non-participating European nations

Outside Europe

References

External links

UEFA Under-19 Futsal EURO 2019, UEFA.com

 
2019
2019–20 in European futsal
2019 in youth association football
September 2019 sports events in Europe
International futsal competitions hosted by Latvia
Sports competitions in Riga
Football in Riga
2019 in Latvian football